Al-Qābil is a village in Al Buraimi Governorate (formerly Ad Dhahirah Region), in northwestern Oman. Described as a "prosperous market village", Al-Qabil lies at a curve in the road before "descending into the Sa'dah basin from the west". The village is said to contain populations of Al Bu-Shamis group of the Na'im who moved into the village from across the border with the Emirates. Wadi Sarin is said to flow nearby.

The village contains Al Qabil Rest House, a quaint licensed country hotel. The village of Gharbi Hafit lies to the immediate north and the hamlet of Sharqi Hafit to the immediate east.

See also
 Al-Buraimi
 Hamasah
 Mahdah
 Sunaynah

References

Populated places in Al Buraimi Governorate